Indicatrix may refer to:

Differential geometry 
 Dupin indicatrix, a conic section which describes the local shape of a surface
 Tissot's indicatrix, which describes and visualizes the distortion of a map
 Tangent indicatrix, an object in differential geometry related to a closed space curve

Optics 
 Indicatrix, a special case of the index ellipsoid in the study of crystals and refractive indices